Miguel Carranza Fernández (1780, San José – 1841) was a Costa Rican politician.

1780 births
1841 deaths
People from San José, Costa Rica
Costa Rican people of Basque descent
Vice presidents of Costa Rica
Costa Rican businesspeople